Delgosha Garden is one of the historical gardens in Shiraz, Iran near Tomb of Sa’di and it belongs to the pre-Islamic era of the Sassanian Empire.

In Safavid dynasty, Delgosha Garden was one of the most famous gardens in Shiraz. Some of the buildings in this garden were constructed in Qajar dynasty. Most of the trees in this 7.5 hectare garden are citrus such as Orange and sour orange. The main building which has three stories with two entrances in two sides and a porch in the middle floor with a view of pool is a sign of glorious days. The Sa’di’s Tomb Canal is passing through this garden.

Delgosha Garden was at the peak of prosperity during the reign of Timur Gurkhani, so much so that it is said that after seeing it, Timur built a garden of the same name in Samarkand. This garden was also very famous in the Safavid period, so that in the writings and paintings left by European tourists at that time, the name of the garden is often mentioned.

Between Nader Shah period and Zandieh dynasty, this garden suffered a lot of damage and was rebuilt during the reign of Karim Khan Zand. In this garden, buildings related to the Qajar period can be seen.

The garden mansion is built in the style of the Sassanid palaces of Bishapour, which consists of a hall with four emperors. The mansion has three floors and a porch with two columns. The construction of this mansion was done during the Zandieh period. The mansion has mirrors with oil paintings with wood ceilings and flowerbeds decorated with flowers and shrubs.  A court that marks the glory days of the garden.

 

Around the porch, poems by Shurideh are written in Nastaliq script. The first pergola in Iran has been recorded in this garden.  In front of the building, there is a large stone pool.

The area of this garden is 7.5 hectares and it is surrounded by orange and a little orange trees. These trees bear fruit from mid-April to mid-May, and their beautiful white blooms emit a pleasant odor in the air.

The water that flows from the aqueduct spring of Saadi's tomb passes through this garden

Museum of Delgosha garden:

The Delgosha Garden mansion is now dedicated to a museum of historical objects and old radios. In this museum, works from different historical periods before the Achaemenid period to the Qajar period have been exposed to visitors.

In this museum, the Quran related to the Seljuk period has been exposed to the public, and writing on deer skin is one of its unique features. In addition, in the museum of precious objects, various coins, stamps, matches and maps of Iran in different periods. A history from the Achaemenid period to the Qajar period is on display.

Radio Museum in Delgosha Garden:

Part of this place is dedicated to the Radio Museum and now 50 radios are on public display, each of which is related to the beginning of radio production in different historical periods. One of the unique radios in this museum is the oil radio, which works with oil and has a special engineering structure.

 

When you cross the Quran Gate and cross the square, you take the east route, you pass by the mansions of Haft Tanan and Chehel Tanan to reach Delgosha Garden at the beginning of Bustan Street! It is one of the largest and most beautiful gardens in Shiraz, a garden whose transforming spring is famous for its orange blossoms.

 

In addition to the beautiful natural landscape, Delgosha also has a historical mansion left over from the Sassanid era, a mansion known as the Pergola, which has been renovated for one or two years, allowing tourists to visit it internally.

At the intersection of the main and secondary axes of the garden, there is a mansion (pavilion) from the Zandieh period with special architecture, which has three floors in the southern part and two floors in the northern part. This building, according to the architectural style of the Sassanid palaces of Bishapour, consists of a hall and four royal residences. The interior of the pavilion is decorated with mirrored walls and oil paintings, as well as wooden ceilings and plaster of flowers and shrubs.

 

On the middle floor of a porch belonging to the glory days of the garden, facing the large stone pool in front of the mansion.

Around the porch, poems by Shorideh Shirazi (a blind poet of the 13th century AH who is buried in Saadi's tomb) are written in Nastaliq script on plaster.

The building is now strong and stable, but has been destroyed and even set on fire several times during different periods.

This work was registered as one of the national works of Iran on October 28, 2002 with the registration number 912.

 

The garden we now have in front of us, where we can walk freely, sit on its benches and walk in its mansion and museum, has not always been so magnificent and standing. Delgosha has seen many historical periods.

Some believe that the history of the garden dates back to the Sassanid period, ie before Islam, and some consider it to be related to the period of Al-Inju and Al-Muzaffar, and others, such as James Moreau, a British diplomat and writer, traced the first years of his life to the Zandi period. Attribute.

 

But what one can be sure of, and the historical evidence proves, is that the heyday here is with Timur Gurkhani, the first Timurid king. After the extinction of Al-Muzaffar, Timur Gurkhani went to Persia and ordered the construction of a palace in the garden of Delgosha and at the same time in Samarkand.

 

Its settlement reached its peak in the Safavid period and after Afshari until Mohammad Taghi Khan Shirazi revolted against Nader Shah Afshar in 1150 and Delgsha disappeared like other gardens of Shiraz and Nader Shah's death and chaos. The aftermath also leaves a ruin of it.

Delgosha Garden is located in the northeastern part of Shiraz, on the southern side of Tang Ab Khan, at the foot of a mountain.

References 

 

Buildings and structures in Shiraz
Safavid architecture
Gardens in Iran
Tourist attractions in Shiraz